Heaven on Earth is a 1935 Austrian musical comedy film directed by E. W. Emo and starring Lizzi Holzschuh, Ilona Massey, and Heinz Rühmann.

It was shot at the Rosenhügel Studios in Vienna. The film's sets were designed by the art director Julius von Borsody.

Cast

References

Bibliography

External links 
 

1935 films
1935 musical comedy films
Austrian musical comedy films
1930s German-language films
Films directed by E. W. Emo
Austrian black-and-white films
Films scored by Robert Stolz
Films shot at Rosenhügel Studios